The Regular Grand Lodge of Macedonia is a Grand Lodge of Freemasonry operating in North Macedonia. It has three constituent lodges:
Lodge Saint Naum of Ohrid
Lodge Old Skopje
Lodge Justinian The Great
The Regular Grand Lodge of Macedonia is not recognised as a Regular Masonic jurisdiction by the United Grand Lodge of England or other regular jurisdictions. The regular body in North Macedonia is the older Grand Lodge of Macedonia.

External links
 

Freemasonry in North Macedonia